The Mountain Park Academy is a school located in Nakuru, Kenya.

History and operations
The school opened in January 2004.

It consists of eight classrooms and a library and has a capacity of 400 students.

The name Mountain Park is the same name as a church in Stone Mountain, Georgia, United States, that established a partnership with the Robi family who owns and runs the property.

A non-profit organization, the Kenya Project for Education and Spiritual Growth, helps maintain funding for the school, as well as overseeing the sponsorships of children to ensure each student is provided with tuition and books, supplies, and medical care.

Gallery

See also

 Education in Kenya
 List of schools in Kenya

References

2004 establishments in Kenya
Buildings and structures in Rift Valley Province
Christian schools in Kenya
Education in Rift Valley Province
Educational institutions established in 2004
Nakuru
Elementary and primary schools in Kenya